Frank "Dusty" Flanagan was an Irish association football player who played for Drogheda United and won the league cup with "the drogs" in 1984. He also was in the team that played Tottenham Hotspur in the UEFA Cup in 1984. He retired from football in 1992.

References

External links
Drogheda United book signing

Republic of Ireland association footballers
Living people
Association footballers not categorized by position
Year of birth missing (living people)